Morgana Regina Gmach (born June 17, 1994) is a Brazilian rhythmic gymnast. Gmach helped the Brazilian ladies secure a gold-medal triumph in the group all-around at the 2015 Pan American Games in Toronto, Canada, and subsequently competed as a member of the host nation's rhythmic gymnastics squad at the Summer Olympics in Rio de Janeiro by the following year. There, she and fellow gymnasts Emanuelle Lima, Jessica Maier, Gabrielle da Silva, and Francielly Pereira attained a total score of 32.649 on the combination of ribbons, hoops, and clubs for the ninth spot in the qualifying phase of the group all-around, narrowly missing out of the final roster by more than a single point.

See also
List of Olympic rhythmic gymnasts for Brazil

References

External links 
 

1997 births
Living people
Brazilian rhythmic gymnasts
People from Toledo, Paraná
Sportspeople from Paraná (state)
Gymnasts at the 2016 Summer Olympics
Olympic gymnasts of Brazil
Gymnasts at the 2015 Pan American Games
Pan American Games gold medalists for Brazil
Pan American Games medalists in gymnastics
Medalists at the 2015 Pan American Games
20th-century Brazilian women
21st-century Brazilian women